RAYS Linux (previously Sun Wah Linux) was a Chinese Debian-based Linux distribution.

Development and distribution

Sunwah Linux was a Debian-based distribution. It was the first Chinese Linux distribution to receive Linux Standard Base (LSB) certification. The system architecture was designed in Hong Kong and the programming was developed in Nanjing. The distribution was sponsored by the Sunwah Group in Hong Kong and the Jiangsu Provincial Government of China.

Sunwah - PearL Linux (abbreviated SWP), the technology training entity of the group, has been providing research assistance, testing, and training support for the distribution. SWP is a joint establishment of the Hong Kong Polytechnic University and the Sunwah Group.

In 2005, Sunwah Linux was installed in over 140,000 PCs in primary and secondary schools in China.

Awards
In April 2006, Sunwah Linux won the Best Linux Desktop Application Award at the LinuxWorld Conference and Expo in Boston. According to Albert Chung, who presented the distribution to the judges, "The competition was fierce.  We were proud of our Chinese Linux desktop distribution being recognized by industry experts and judges."

References
Largest Asian Linux Rollout Ever: 140,000-Plus PCs Deploying to Chinese Schools
 Teaching Children To Love Linux
Chinese Ed. Dept. in Major Linux Buy
Debian Debuts in China

See also
Sunwah – PearL Linux

External links 
OpenRAYS.org, the community website of the distribution, at the Internet Archive, January 2014
SunWah Linux, the official website of the distribution, at the Internet Archive, February 2015
RAYS at DistroWatch

Debian-based distributions
Discontinued Linux distributions
Chinese-language Linux distributions
Linux distributions